Rachel Leskovac (born 5 June 1976) is an English actress and singer. She is known for portraying the roles of Kelly Yorke in the BBC One medical drama series Holby City (2003–2004), Natasha Blakeman in the ITV soap opera Coronation Street (2008–2010, 2020–2021), and Joanne Cardsley in the Channel 4 soap opera Hollyoaks (2015–2016). In 2022, she joined the revival of the BBC One school-based drama series Waterloo Road as English teacher Coral Walker. She has been nominated for a Laurence Olivier Award.

Early life
Leskovac was born in Bradford, England. Her mother is English and her father is of Croatian descent. Leskovac has a younger sister, Sophie, and an older sister, Kate. Leskovac attended St Joseph's Catholic College in Bradford and during her youth was a member of local theatre group Scala Kids. She later trained at the Liverpool Institute of Performing Arts, graduating in 1998.

Acting career
Leskovac received critical acclaim for her performance as the young Viv in the musical Spend Spend Spend and was nominated for the Laurence Olivier Award for Best Actress in a Musical at the 2000 Laurence Olivier Awards. She played serial killer nurse Kelly Yorke on Holby City. In 2003, she played Ciara Pickering in the fourth series of At Home with the Braithwaites. In 2006, she also starred in a TV movie called Losing Gemma for Granada TV. In April 2008, Leskovac was signed up to play Natasha Blakeman, a hairdresser on the ITV soap Coronation Street. She left the soap in 2010. In July 2020, it was announced that Leskovac would be reprising her role as Natasha,  In 2021, Leskovac left Coronation Street as Natasha died from accidentally getting shot.

Leskovac played Margaret, sister of Betty in the 1950s drama A Passionate Woman alongside Billie Piper in 2010. In 2011, Leskovac starred in an episode of the Sky 1 sitcom Trollied as Leanne the deputy manager who was on maternity leave. In 2012, Leskovac played teacher Lara Heaton in the Channel 4 TV comedy drama series Shameless, and she played Karen, a beauty therapist, in an episode of the Jimmy McGovern drama series Accused. In 2013, she appeared in Last Tango in Halifax before returning to the role in 2020. In 2014, she played Susie Nightingale in the second series of WPC 56. She also appeared in the 2014 crime drama Happy Valley as Julie, the wife of drug dealer-turned-kidnapper Ashley Cowgill. In 2015, she returned to the role of Susie in the third series of WPC 56. In September 2015, she joined the cast of teenage soap opera Hollyoaks as regular Joanne Cardsley. Leskovac received critical acclaim for her role in Hollyoaks. She left the role in December 2016 concluding a dramatic storyline with her.

References

External links
 

1976 births
Living people
English television actresses
English soap opera actresses
English stage actresses
English musical theatre actresses
English Shakespearean actresses
English people of Croatian descent
English Roman Catholics
Alumni of the Liverpool Institute for Performing Arts
Actresses from Bradford
Actresses from Yorkshire
People educated at St. Joseph's Catholic College, Bradford
20th-century English actresses
21st-century English actresses